John Shearer Fletcher (22 December 1888 – 15 February 1934) was a New Zealand member of the House of Representatives for  in Auckland. Born in Scotland, he came to New Zealand in 1916 to join his brothers in their construction business, out of which grew Fletcher Construction.

Early life
Fletcher was born at Kirkintilloch, Scotland, the son of a builder, John Shearer Fletcher, and his wife, Janet Montgomery. He received his entire education through scholarships. He was one of thirteen children.

By age 24, Fletcher was headmaster under the Kirkintilloch school board for technical and commercial classes. He then moved to Glasgow and became secretary for the Scottish Class Teachers' Association, and was on the executive of the Scottish Education Institute. He was vice-president of the Young Men's Christian Association (YMCA). He undertook studies in construction in the United States and in Canada.

Professional career in New Zealand
In 1916, Fletcher migrated to Dunedin, New Zealand, to join his brothers in their construction business. The company had been founded in 1909 after his brother James had come to Dunedin in the previous year. His brother James started to concentrate on business in Auckland and Wellington, and John Shearer Fletcher took over the Dunedin branch. Fletcher was an executive member of the Dunedin Manufacturers' Association. Of poor health, he retired from business during the 1920s and moved to Auckland.

Member of Parliament

In the 1928 election, Fletcher defeated Fred Bartram for Grey Lynn. After having threatened his government in September 1929 to cross the house over unemployment and economic issues, Fletcher became an Independent during 1930.

Private life and death
Fletcher married Alice Emily Murphy in 1919. In Auckland, Fletcher participated in public life, and he was active with the YMCA, other social movements, and belonged to the Rotary Club. He was interested in politics and economics, and involved in association football, cricket, and lawn bowls. He died on 15 February 1934 and is buried at Hillsborough Cemetery in Auckland. His wife died on 28 June 1976.

Notes

References

External links
Better photo, but possibly not out of copyright

1888 births
1934 deaths
Independent MPs of New Zealand
United Party (New Zealand) MPs
20th-century New Zealand businesspeople
Businesspeople in construction
Scottish emigrants to New Zealand
Burials at Hillsborough Cemetery, Auckland
Politicians from Kirkintilloch
Unsuccessful candidates in the 1931 New Zealand general election
Members of the New Zealand House of Representatives
New Zealand MPs for Auckland electorates
YMCA leaders